Amalda sinensis is a species of sea snail, a marine gastropod mollusk in the family Ancillariidae.

References

External links

sinensis
Gastropods described in 1859